FemtoLab is a laser spectroscopy and communications laboratory in the physics department at Stevens Institute of Technology, Hoboken, New Jersey The lab's director is Rainer Martini. 

The main focus of the research in this laboratory is the development of new devices and application in the infrared region of the spectrum. A specific focus is thereby on security as well as communication application.

Research
In a long term study the laboratory compares since 2001 atmospheric propagation at different wavelengths in indoor and outdoor studies to find the optimal wavelength for free-space optical communication. It uses a quantum cascade laser to transmit data using the mid-infrared part of the spectrum, which propagates much more favorably under bad weather conditions like fog.

A secondary focus of research is based on the component development for the far-infrared spectral region, the so-called terahertz spectrum. Components include modulators and lenses, and are based on optical excitation which allow for active control.

External links
 
 Physics department at Stevens Institute of Technology
 www.freespaceoptics.org

Education in New Jersey
Stevens Institute of Technology